Peter M. Weichsel (born 1943) is an American professional bridge player from Encinitas, California.

College and war years
Early Weichsel started playing bridge at home with his family, but did not get hooked until 1963 when he was a student at Queens College, New York. He dropped out of college and became a Life Master in 1964. His bridge career was interrupted by the Vietnam War. After discharge, he lived in San Francisco in a fleabag hotel and  became an "active member" of the counterculture. He felt this was a transforming experience and to the present describes himself as a reformed hippie.

The Precision Team and Hall of Fame
Weichsel returned to New York and bridge playing in the mid-1960s. His appearance, with puka shells around his neck, "really long" straight hair, beads and bell bottoms, caused "the ultra-straight bridge community" to give him "tons of strange looks...and an occasional shake of the head." He did not get a haircut until 1980.  Seen as a young renegade, Weichsel feels that his looks may have helped his results, lulling unknowing opponents into thinking he could not have been much of a bridge player. 

He came to prominence in 1970 as a member of C.C. Wei's "Precision Team" team, a group of young American players that won the Spingold, defeating the defending champions who were also 1970 Bermuda Bowl champions. The bridge world was described as being in disbelief by their victory. When he won the 2019 Mitchell BAM, he had the distinction of winning a national title in every decade since the 1970s.

Weichsel was inducted into the ACBL Hall of Fame in 2004.

Bridge accomplishments

Honors

 ACBL Hall of Fame, 2004

Awards
 
Fishbein Trophy (2) 1980, 2000

Wins

 Bermuda Bowl (2) 1983, 2001
 World Mixed Pairs (1) 1990
 North American Bridge Championships (25)
 von Zedtwitz Life Master Pairs (2) 1977, 1984 
 Silodor Open Pairs (1) 1993 
 Wernher Open Pairs (2) 1980, 1984 
 Nail Life Master Open Pairs (1) 1971 
 Grand National Teams (1) 2003 
 Vanderbilt (4) 1972, 1985, 1989, 1999 
 Mitchell Board-a-Match Teams (5) 1979, 1987, 1996, 2001, 2019 
 Chicago Mixed Board-a-Match (3) 1976, 1989, 2001 
 Reisinger (1) 1973 
 Spingold (6) 1970, 1971, 1980, 1982, 1992, 2000

Runners-up

 North American Bridge Championships (19)
 von Zedtwitz Life Master Pairs (1) 1972 
 Lebhar IMP Pairs (1) 1987 
 Blue Ribbon Pairs (1) 1983 
 Nail Life Master Open Pairs (1) 1989 
 Grand National Teams (2) 2000, 2001 
 Jacoby Open Swiss Teams (1) 2000 
 Vanderbilt (3) 1975, 1981, 2008 
 Mitchell Board-a-Match Teams (2) 1968, 1990 
 Chicago Mixed Board-a-Match (1) 2004 
 Reisinger (2) 1983, 1998 
 Spingold (4) 1985, 1988, 1991, 2003

References

External links
  – with video interview
 

1943 births
American contract bridge players
Bermuda Bowl players
People from Encinitas, California
Living people
Place of birth missing (living people)
Date of birth missing (living people)